The Bay of Lübeck is a basin in the southwestern Baltic Sea, off the shores of German states of Mecklenburg-Vorpommern and Schleswig-Holstein. It forms the southwestern part of the Bay of Mecklenburg.

The main port is Travemünde, a borough of the city of Lübeck, at the mouth of river Trave. The Elbe–Lübeck Canal connects the Baltic Sea with the Elbe River. The bay is surrounded by the landstrips of Ostholstein and Nordwestmecklenburg. Located in the North of the Bay, the Hansa-Park amusement park creates a popular sight for families all around the region and Southern Denmark. The Pötenitzer Wiek lake splits the states of Schleswig-Holstein and Mecklenburg-Vorpommern and got historical attention, as it gave East Germany refugees the possibility to flee from East Germany in to West Germany.

Gallery

See also
 Priwall Peninsula with the museum ship Passat
 Travemünder Woche - traditional sailing races on the Bay of Lübeck
 The disaster on May 3, 1945, involving these 3 ships:
 Cap Arcona
 Thielbek
 Deutschland
 U-48
Lighthouses and lightvessels in Germany

External links

 
Lubeck
Lubeck
Lübeck
Bays of the Baltic Sea